A640 may refer to:

 A640 road (England)
 Canon PowerShot A640, a camera
 Quebec Autoroute 640, a road in Canada
 Samsung SPH-A640, a mobile phone